

This is a list of the National Register of Historic Places listings in Mackinac County, Michigan.

This is intended to be a complete list of the properties and districts on the National Register of Historic Places in Mackinac County, Michigan, United States. Latitude and longitude coordinates are provided for many National Register properties and districts; these locations may be seen together in a map.

There are 27 properties and districts listed on the National Register in the county, including 3 National Historic Landmarks.

Current listings

|}

See also

List of Michigan State Historic Sites in Mackinac County, Michigan
 List of National Historic Landmarks in Michigan
 National Register of Historic Places listings in Michigan
 Listings in neighboring counties: Cheboygan, Chippewa, Emmet, Luce, Schoolcraft

References

 
Mackinac County